Anchorage is a home rule-class city in eastern Jefferson County, Kentucky, United States. The population was 2,348 at the 2010 census and an estimated 2,432 in 2018. It is a suburb of Louisville.

History

The land that is now Anchorage was a part of Isaac Hite's 1773 land grant, which awarded most of the land in today's Jefferson County to officers in the Virginia militia, in exchange for their service in the French and Indian War. Early maps refer to the area as "Hite's Mill", and it has also been known as "Hobbs Station". Part of Hite's original grant now makes up the grounds of Central State Hospital and E. P. "Tom" Sawyer State Park.

The origin is The Anchorage, the estate of riverboat captain and early resident James W. Goslee, and was chosen to honor him when the city incorporated in 1878, three years after his death. Tradition says that an anchor hanging inside the rim of a locomotive wheel at the center of town was taken by Goslee from his ship, the Matamora.

The Louisville and Frankfort Railroad (later purchased by the Louisville & Nashville Railroad) was built through the area in 1849. The development of an interurban rail line in 1901 allowed faster travel between Anchorage and Louisville, as well as other towns in the area.

The heavily shaded city, with temperatures often noticeably cooler than in Downtown Louisville, became a popular location for summer homes for wealthy Louisvillians. One such resident was brewing magnate Isaac Wolfe Bernheim, still remembered locally for his philanthropy. In 1914, Bernheim commissioned the firm of Frederick Law Olmsted to design a plan for Anchorage, which would incorporate stone bridges and triangle intersections, similar to Olmsted's plans for Louisville's park system.

The city has long been known as home of some of the area's wealthiest citizens, though the large old estates have mostly been divided up and many new, still upscale, houses have been built in the area, especially since 1977. Part of the city is designated as the Anchorage Historic District, which was listed on the National Register of Historic Places in 1982.

Papa John's Pizza founder John Schnatter is a resident and owns about 6% of the land in Anchorage, including much of the city center. He restored an interurban rail station, three historic buildings and built a fourth in a similar style in the city's center, with plans to build a bank, an upscale restaurant, and a hiking trail, which opened as the Anchorage Trail in June 2008. In an interview, he told the Courier-Journal that his goal was purely to "preserve the city's character".

Geography
Anchorage is located in northeastern Jefferson County at  (38.265370, −85.537571). It is bordered to the south by Middletown. Interstate 265 passes north and east of Anchorage, with access from Exits 29 (Old Henry Road) and 30 (Kentucky Route 146).

Government and public safety
Anchorage is managed by a mayor and six councilmen. Public safety is provided by the Anchorage Police Department, an on duty 24/7 police agency with 10 full-time, sworn officers certified by the Commonwealth of Kentucky.

Demographics

As of the census of 2000, there were 2,264 people, 729 households, and 643 families residing in the city. The racial makeup of the city was 97.13% White, 0.84% Black or African American, 1.33% Asian, 0.27% from other races, and 0.44% from two or more races. Hispanic or Latino of any race were 0.75% of the population.

There were 729 households, out of which 52.4% had children under the age of 18 living with them, 81.9% were married couples living together, 3.7% had a female householder with no husband present, and 11.7% were non-families. 10.6% of all households were made up of individuals, and 4.8% had someone living alone who was 65 years of age or older. The average household size was 3.09 and the average family size was 3.33.

In the city, the population was spread out, with 35.0% under the age of 18, 4.0% from 18 to 24, 20.8% from 25 to 44, 32.2% from 45 to 64, and 8.0% who were 65 years of age or older. The median age was 40 years. For every 100 females, there were 99.1 males. For every 100 females age 18 and over, there were 95.5 males.

The median income for a household in the city was $133,969, and the median income for a family was $147,050. Males had a median income of $100,000 versus $47,188 for females. The per capita income for the city was $63,988. About 1.1% of families and 1.87% of the population were below the poverty line, including 1.2% of those under age 18 and 2.5% of those age 65 or over.

Education
Almost all of Anchorage is zoned to Anchorage Public School (K–8), a part of Anchorage Independent Schools. For high school, Anchorage district residents may attend Jefferson County Public Schools  (JCPS) or Oldham County Schools. A very small portion is zoned to JCPS for grades K-12.

 Kelley Ransdell is the Superintendent of Schools.

Notable people

 Morgan McGarvey, Kentucky state senator 
 Joan Osborne, singer-songwriter
 David C. Novak, CEO of Yum! Brands
 Virginia Pearson, silent movie star
 John Schnatter, founder and former CEO of Papa John's Pizza

Climate
The climate in this area is characterized by hot, humid summers and generally mild to cool winters.  According to the Köppen Climate Classification system, Anchorage has a humid subtropical climate, abbreviated "Cfa" on climate maps.

See also
 National Register of Historic Places listings in Anchorage, Kentucky

References

External links

 City of Anchorage official website
"Anchorage: Edward Hobbs' Actions Gave Town Strong Roots for Growth; River Captain Provided Name" — Article by John Ed Pearce of The Courier-Journal

 
Cities in Kentucky
Louisville metropolitan area
Populated places established in 1878
Cities in Jefferson County, Kentucky